Torn Sails is a 1920 British silent drama film directed by A. V. Bramble and starring Milton Rosmer, Mary Odette and Geoffrey Kerr. It was based on the 1897 novel Torn Sails by Allen Raine. Like much of her work, it is set in a small Welsh village.

Cast
 Milton Rosmer as Hugh Morgan 
 Mary Odette as Gwladys Price 
 Geoffrey Kerr as Ivor Parry 
 Jose Shannon as Maud Owen 
 Leo Gordon as Josh Howells 
 Beatrix Templeton as Mrs. Price

References

External links

1920 films
British drama films
Films based on British novels
Films directed by A. V. Bramble
Ideal Film Company films
Films set in Wales
British black-and-white films
British silent feature films
1920 drama films
1920s English-language films
1920s British films
Silent drama films